AF Leporis, also known as HD 35850, is an F-type main-sequence star located  away from the Solar System in the constellation of Lepus. With an apparent magnitude of 6.3, it is near the limit of naked eye visibility under ideal conditions.

AF Leporis is a member of the Beta Pictoris moving group, with an astronomically young age of about 24 million years. It hosts a circumstellar disk and one known exoplanet.

Planetary system 

In 2023, a gas giant exoplanet was discovered in orbit around AF Leporis by direct imaging using the NIRC2 instrument at the W. M. Keck Observatory and the SPHERE instrument at the Very Large Telescope. It was also detected in astrometric data from the Hipparcos and Gaia spacecraft, allowing an accurate measurement of its mass.

There have been multiple studies of AF Leporis b, which have found somewhat different parameters. All studies have found that the planet has a fairly eccentric orbit.

See also 

 51 Eridani
 Beta Pictoris

References 

Lepus (constellation)
F-type main-sequence stars
RS Canum Venaticorum variables
Beta Pictoris moving group
Planetary systems with one confirmed planet
Circumstellar disks
1817
BD-12 1169
035850
025486
94945758
Leporis, AF